Janville-en-Beauce (literally Janville in Beauce) is a commune in the Eure-et-Loir department in northern France. It was established on 1 January 2019 by merging the former communes of Janville (the seat), Allaines-Mervilliers and Le Puiset.

Population

See also
 Communes of the Eure-et-Loir department

References

Communes of Eure-et-Loir